is a Japanese synchronized swimmer.

Career

References

1993 births
Living people
Japanese synchronized swimmers
Olympic synchronized swimmers of Japan
Synchronized swimmers at the 2012 Summer Olympics
Synchronized swimmers at the 2016 Summer Olympics
Asian Games medalists in artistic swimming
Artistic swimmers at the 2014 Asian Games
World Aquatics Championships medalists in synchronised swimming
Synchronized swimmers at the 2011 World Aquatics Championships
Synchronized swimmers at the 2013 World Aquatics Championships
Synchronized swimmers at the 2015 World Aquatics Championships
Olympic bronze medalists for Japan
Olympic medalists in synchronized swimming
Medalists at the 2016 Summer Olympics
Asian Games silver medalists for Japan
Medalists at the 2014 Asian Games
Universiade medalists in synchronized swimming
Universiade silver medalists for Japan
Medalists at the 2013 Summer Universiade
21st-century Japanese women